Gourlay Brothers was a marine engineering and shipbuilding company based in Dundee, Scotland. It existed between 1846 and 1908.

Company history

The company had its origins in the Dundee Foundry, founded in 1791. By 1820 the foundry was manufacturing steam engines, building engines and boilers for the steam tug William Wallace in 1829, and in the 1830s building locomotives for the Dundee and Newtyle and the Arbroath and Forfar Railways. James Stirling (1800–1876) was manager of the Dundee Foundry until 1846.

In 1846 the Foundry was taken over and renamed Gourlay, Mudie & Co. This company was dissolved in 1853, and then operated as Gourlay Brothers & Co., with four brothers – Alexander, William, Gershom, and Henry Gourlay – as partners.

In May 1854, Gourlay's turned to shipbuilding, leasing land at the east end of Marine Parade to use as a slipway. Their first vessels were built for the coastal trade, but they went on to build a number of cargo ships for the Dundee, Perth and London Shipping Company. The business prospered, largely due to the efforts of Henry Gourlay, a member of the Institution of Engineers and Shipbuilders in Scotland and of the Institution of Naval Architects. By 1866 Gourlay's had become the largest of the five shipbuilding firms in Dundee, employing about 300 men, and building 14,000 tons of shipping between 1861 and 1867. In 1867 they launched the Dundee of 1,295 tons, at that time the largest ship built on the Tay. In 1869 Gourlay's leased more land downriver from their yard, which they named Camperdown Dock, enabling even larger ships to be built. In 1871 five vessels were launched, all of more than 1,000 tons. In 1876 seven of the twenty-three ships built in Dundee were launched from Gourlay's yard. However, a serious slump in shipbuilding occurred in the mid-1880s, with Gourlay's building only three ships totalling 4,000 tons in 1885 and 1886. The recovery came with the resumption of international orders; in 1890, Gourlay's built 11,616 tons of shipping, with orders coming from South Africa, South America, India, Russia, Australia, Finland, Turkey and France.

Gershom Gourlay, the last of the original partners, retired in 1889, and his sons, Henry Garrett and Charles Gershom Gourlay, with James Gordon Lyon, became the directors of the company. Another slump occurred in the mid-1890s, with 1894 the worst year for orders yet, with only three small paddle-boats built. Ship repairing and refitting helped to provide some employment, but it was not until 1897 that orders begin to rise. Although Gourlay's were pioneers in the use of the screw propeller, they now gained a reputation for building paddle steamers. British railway companies became regular customers, and of the thirty vessels built between 1902 and 1908, nine were for the Great Eastern, the Great Central, and the London and South Western Railways.

Unfortunately, labour relations soured, and between 1902 and 1904 the yard experienced a three-week strike by joiners, a demarcation dispute, a 14-week strike by engineers, and various minor disputes. In 1904 the yard had been virtually closed, its total output being a 364-ton ship and two tugs. The same year it became a private joint stock company under the name of Gourlay Brothers & Company (Dundee) Ltd. with Charles Gershom Gourlay holding the controlling majority of shares, with Henry, Fanny, Kenneth and William Gourlay, James Lyon and William Fyffe holding lesser amounts.

Output for 1905 reached a total of nearly 12,000 tons, and that year also saw the completion of a modernisation programme, with new machinery and complete electrification of the yard. In 1906 Gourlay's launched over 12,600 tons of shipping, its most productive year yet. However the following year output sank to only 6,276 tons. The lack of orders and the expensive modernisation programme led the company into serious debt. This, along with higher prices of raw materials, pushed up the cost of building, shortening profit margins. Demand for new shipping continued to fall and by the end of 1907 orders were few.

On 8 June 1908, the company was finally wound up. In May 1909 the equipment of the Yard and Foundry were sold at public auction, and on 23 June 1910, the company was formally dissolved. In its time Gourlay's launched over 200 ships.

Ships constructed

References

National Archives, UK

External links
 Dundee City Council Archive: List of Gourlay Shipping

Manufacturing companies established in 1846
Manufacturing companies disestablished in 1908
Companies based in Dundee 
Marine engine manufacturers
Defunct shipbuilding companies of Scotland
Engine manufacturers of  the United Kingdom
Defunct companies of Scotland
History of Dundee
1846 establishments in Scotland
1908 disestablishments in Scotland
British companies disestablished in 1908
British companies established in 1846